Tony Arnold is an American soprano vocalist, specializing in contemporary chamber music.  She was the 2015 winner of the Brandeis University Creative Arts Award.

References

American sopranos
Living people
Year of birth missing (living people)
21st-century American women singers
21st-century American singers
21st-century classical musicians